Erin Murphy (born 1964) is an American actress.

Erin Murphy may also refer to:

Erin Murphy (poet) (fl. 2000s), American poet
Erin Murphy (politician) (born 1960), American politician from Minnesota